Altamura is a city and commune in southern Italy.

It may also refer to:
 Altamura Island, in the Gulf of California, Mexico
 Altamura Cathedral
 Pane di Altamura, a type of bread made from the Altamura area
 A.S.D. Leonessa Altamura, an Italian association football club
 Altamura Man, a partially preserved fossil of the genus Homo, found near Altamura

People
 Altamura Painter, a classical Greek vase painter
 Francesco Saverio Altamura (1822–1897), an Italian painter
 Giovanni Pipino di Altamura (died 1357), Italian nobleman
 Tullio Altamura (born 18 July 1924), an Italian film actor

See also
 Altamurana, a breed of sheep named after the town of Altamura
 Altamira (disambiguation)
 Elio Altramura, an Italian art director